Benjamin Hobson (1816–1873) (Chinese：合信) was a Protestant medical missionary who served with the London Missionary Society in imperial China during its Qing dynasty. His Treatise on Physiology, reproducing and elaborating on work by William Cheselden, helped revolutionize Chinese and later Japanese medical understanding and treatment.

Life
Hobson was born in 1816 in Welford, Northamptonshire, in England. He graduated from London University with a MB and passed an examination as a MRCS.

It left London on 28 July 1839, and reached Anyer on 12 November 12 and Macao on 18 December. Assisted by Elijah Bridgman, Hobson found a residence and joined the local Medical Missionary Society. Its hospital reopened on August 1, 1840. When William Lockhart left for Zhoushan at the end of the month and Dr Diver retired from poor health soon afterwards, Hobson was left in sole charge of its operation. In early 1843, he left to establish the Medical Missionary Hospital Hong Kong. This opened to patients on June 1 and the demand for its services so outstripped both expectations and capacity that he relied heavily on help from Chinese assistants. This led him to consider how to explain western medical training to the Chinese, then reliant on often pseudoscientific traditional medicine.

In 1845, his wife's health was so poor that they left for Britain in July but she died while at anchor off Dungeness on December 22. Left with a young son and daughter, he married Rebecca Morrison, the daughter of his fellow Chinese missionary Robert, while in England. He returned with her and Mr Hirschberg on the Hugh Walker. This left Britain on March 11, 1847, and reached Hong Kong on July 27, whereupon he resumed direction of its hospital.

He visited Guangzhou (then known as "Canton") with Mr Gillespie in October 1847 and moved there the next February, operating a clinic out of his residence. In April, he opened a pharmacy and, in June, purchased the house on Kum-Le-Fo (Jīnlì Bù, . "Golden Benefit Wharf") in the western suburbs for use as the Missionary Hospital or  Clinic   Huìài Yīguǎn). While there, he was assisted by the Chinese ministers and missionaries Liang Fa and Zhou Xue. At the end of 1854, he traveled to Shanghai for a five-week rest for health reasons. He and his family were forced to evacuate to Hong Kong in October 1856 on account of the onset of the Second Opium War.

The missionary community of Shanghai prevailed upon him to return in February 1857 and he took Dr Lockhart's place at their hospital when Lockhart returned to England at the end of that year. His eldest son took work with a merchant house, but the rest of the family returned with him to Europe, reaching England in March 1859. His health not permitting his return to China, he then resided at Clifton and Cheltenham. He died at Forest Hill near London in 1873.

Works
Benjamin Hobson published the following works:

 . & 
 . 
 . 
 . 
 . 
 , revised ed. 1865. 
 , reprinted at Shanghai 1857. 
 . 
 . 
 . 
 . 
 . 
 . 
 . 
 . 
 ,  including translations of some New Testament chapters
 .
 . 
 . & 
 . 
 . 
 .

Five of the medical works were published with assistance from Kuan Mao-tsai. The illustrations of his Treatise on Physiology were derived from William Cheselden's 1730 Anatomical Tables and 1733 Osteographia. Hobson's work has been called "instrumental" in introducing Western anatomical knowledge to China and Japan, beginning their shift away from traditional understandings based on the flow of qi and other pseudoscience.

See also
 Protestantism
 Peter Parker and John Kenneth MacKenzie

Notes

References

Citations

Bibliography
 .
 .
 .

1816 births
1873 deaths
Alumni of University College London
Protestant missionaries in China
Protestant writers
English Protestant missionaries
Christian medical missionaries
British expatriates in China
People from Welford, Northamptonshire